Armin von Büren (20 April 1928 – 10 February 2018) was a Swiss cyclist. A professional from 1948 to 1962 and a specialist in six-day races, he competed in 58 and won 13. He also won the European Madison Championships in 1953 and 1954 and the European Omnium Championships in 1956. He also occasionally competed on the road and won the Tour du Lac Léman in 1951 and 1953.

His brothers Oskar and Émile were also professional cyclists.

Major results

Track

1950
 1st Six Days of Hanover (with Hugo Koblet)
 3rd Six Days of Paris
1951
 1st  (with Ferdi Kübler)
 3rd Six Days of Saint-Étienne
 3rd Six Days of Berlin
1952
 1st Six Days of Dortmund (with Hugo Koblet)
 1st Six Days of Frankfurt (with Hugo Koblet)
 1st Six Days of Ghent (with Walter Bucher)
 1st Six Days of Kiel (with Jean Roth)
 3rd Six Days of London
1953
 1st  Madison, European Track Championships (with Hugo Koblet)
 1st Six Days of Brussels (with Hugo Koblet)
 1st Six Days of Frankfurt (with Hugo Koblet)
 2nd Six Days of Dortmund
 3rd Six Days of Hanover
1954
 1st  Madison, European Track Championships (with Hugo Koblet)
 1st Six Days of Zurich (with Hugo Koblet)
 2nd Six Days of Antwerp
 3rd Six Days of Frankfurt
1955
 1st Six Days of Dortmund (with Hugo Koblet)
1956
 1st  Omnium, European Track Championships
 1st  (with Hugo Koblet)
1957
 1st  Sprint, National Championships
 1st Six Days of Zurich (with Gerrit Schulte)
 1st Six Days of Münster (with Jean Roth)
 2nd Six Days of Antwerp
 2nd Grand Prix de Paris
1959
 1st  Sprint, National Championships
1961
 1st Six Days of Madrid (with Oscar Plattner)
 1st Six Days of New York (with Oscar Plattner)

Road
1951
 1st Tour du Lac Léman
1952
 1st Rund um Altdorf
1953
 1st Tour du Lac Léman
 10th Züri-Metzgete

References

External links

1928 births
2018 deaths
Swiss male cyclists
Swiss track cyclists
Cyclists from Zürich